SRF 1 (SRF eins) is a German-language Swiss television channel, one of three produced by the SRG SSR public-service broadcasting group (the others being SRF zwei and SRF info). The channel, formerly known as SF1, was renamed on 16 December 2012, together with its sister German-speaking TV channels and five radio channels, as part of an exercise aimed at emphasizing their common ownership as well as establishing a shared web presence for all of them.

The channel promotes itself as "a full-service TV station with a high proportion of home-produced content, especially documentaries and dramas" that offers "news and current affairs, education, arts, and entertainment for all", and it focuses on drama, entertainment, news and current affairs.

Programming

Children
The Adventures of Hello Kitty & Friends (Die Abenteuer von Hello Kitty & Friends)
The Adventures of Paddington Bear (Die Abenteuer von Paddington Bär)
The Adventures of Tintin (Tim und Struppi)
Alfred J Kwak
Archibald the Koala (Archibald der Detektiv)
Arthur (Erdferkel Arthur und seine Freunde))
Babar (Babar der Elefantenkönig)
Barbapapa
Bobobobs (Die Bobobobs)
Bob the Builder (Bob der Baumeister)
Bump in the Night (Bumpy Chaos in der Nacht)
Caillou
Calimero
Canimals
Captain Bluebear (Käpt’n Blaubär)
Count Duckula (Graf Duckula)
Grisu (Grisu, der kleine Drache)
Hamtaro
Hallo Spencer
Jim Button and Luke the Engine Driver (Jim Knopf und Lukas der Lokomotivführer)
The Legend of White Fang (Wolfsblut)
Kid vs. Kat (Coop gegen Kat)
Löwenzahn (Episode 398-401)
Little Mole (Der kleine Maulwurf)
The Moomin (Die Mumins)
Minuscule
Pat & Mat
Pingu
Pieter Post (Season 3-5)
Seabert (Die kleine Robbe Albert)
Shaun the Sheep (Shaun das Schaf)
The Snorks (Die Schnorchels)
Rupert (Rupert, der Bär)
Thomas & Friends (Season 1-4), (Thomas und seine Freunde)
Wallace and Gromit (Wallace und Gromit)
The World of Peter Rabbit and Friends (Peter Hase und seine Freunde)
The Wombles (Die Wombels)
The Wonderful Adventures of Nils (Wunderbare Reise des kleinen Nils Holgersson mit den Wildgänsen)

Entertainment 

Eurovision Choir
Eurovision Song Contest (final)

Information 

10vor10
Der Club
DOK
Einstein
Eisbär, Affe & Co. (Episode 150)
Kassensturz
Leben live
Literaturclub
Puls
Rundschau
Panorama (9 July 2011)
Schweiz aktuell
SRF Tagesschau
Zapp (19 December 2009)

Series 

Die Anstalt (Episode 50 and 51)
Extra 3 (1990–present)
Gomorrah (Gomorrha - Die Serie) (2017–present)
heute-show (Episode 32)
Jack Taylor (2015, 2017)
Kesslers Expedition
Line of Duty (2016)
nuhr im Ersten (2009–present)
Prime Suspect (Heißer Verdacht) (2007-2008, 2010)
Tatort (2008–present)
The Fall (The Fall – Tod in Belfast) (2016)
The Guardian (The Guardian - Retter mit Herz) (2005)

Sport 

FIFA World Cup
UEFA European Championship

Talk

Aeschbacher
Arena

Logos and identities

References

External links
 
Schweizer Radio und Fernsehen (SRF) - official site
The history of Schweizer Fernsehen

Television stations in Switzerland
Television channels and stations established in 1953
German-language television in Switzerland
1953 establishments in Switzerland